Columbia station is a train station in Columbia, South Carolina. It is served by Amtrak's Silver Star train. The street address is 850 Pulaski Street. The station opened in 1991, replacing the 1903-built Seaboard Air Line station two blocks east.

See also
Union Station (Columbia, South Carolina)

References

External links 

Columbia Amtrak Station (USA Rail Guide -- Train Web)
Columbia, South Carolina Railroad Stations (South Carolina Railroad Stations)

Amtrak stations in South Carolina
Railway stations in the United States opened in 1991
Buildings and structures in Columbia, South Carolina
Transportation in Columbia, South Carolina
1991 establishments in South Carolina